Evander Holyfield vs. Pinklon Thomas, billed as "The Countdown Continues...", was a professional boxing match contested on December 9, 1988.

Background
In his previous fight, Evander Holyfield had defeated James Tillis by referee technical decision in his heavyweight debut. After Holyfield's victory, his next opponent was announced to be former WBC heavyweight champion Pinklon Thomas. In Thomas' previous fight, he had been knocked out by Mike Tyson in his first title shot since losing his WBC title in 1986 to Trevor Berbick. Following his loss to Tyson, Thomas had not fought since, going on a 16-month hiatus before agreeing to face Holyfield.

The winner of this fight was expected to next face former WBA heavyweight champion Michael Dokes, with the winner of that fight expected to be next in line for a shot at Mike Tyson's undisputed heavyweight championship. Dokes appeared on the undercard, defeating Rocky Sekorski by unanimous decision to retain the WBC Continental Americas heavyweight title.

The fight
For the second consecutive fight, Holyfield would earn a victory as a result of a corner stoppage, this time after round seven. Though he again failed to gain a knockdown, he nevertheless dominated Thomas throughout, having won every round on two judge's scorecards while the third gave Thomas a single round. With Thomas having endured punishment for seven rounds, his trainer Angelo Dundee refused to let him go back for the eighth, giving Evander Holyfield the victory by referee technical decision.

Fight card

References

1988 in boxing
Boxing on Showtime
Thomas
December 1988 sports events in the United States
Boxing matches at Boardwalk Hall